This is a list of phenomena specific to the Internet within China.

Memes
Has spawned many parody images posted by web users. The name of the meme itself is a parody of "Gangnam Style".
Back Dorm Boys – two Chinese males lip-synching to Backstreet Boys in a dormitory.
The Bus Uncle — the reaction of an angry middle aged man towards a young man seated behind him on a bus in Hong Kong, which became widespread over the Internet.
Honglaowai – an American, named George Costow, who sang Chinese communist songs which he put on YouTube.
"I and my little friends were struck dumb!" – a meme used for surprise and bewilderment. Originated in 2013 in a primary school student's essay.
"I would rather cry in a BMW" – an old, long-familiar phrase made famous by Ma Nuo, a 21-year-old contestant on the game show If You Are the One, when asked by a suitor whether or not she would go ride on his bicycle with him on a date. The phrase became a meme and caused an outcry on the Internet and led to serious soul-searching about materialism in early 21st-century Chinese society.
Jia Junpeng – a post on the Baidu Tieba World of Warcraft forum which attracted more than 400,000 viewers and 17,000 replies, despite only consisting of the text "Jia Junpeng, your mother is calling you home for dinner".
Jinsanpang – literally "Kim Fatty the third", widely used as a moniker for North Korean leader Kim Jong-un; the term was censored in China after North Korean officials had lodged an official complaint.
 "Just out getting some soy sauce" – in 2008, Edison Chen, a celebrity from Hong Kong, was involved in a nude photo scandal which shocked many around the world. A Guangzhou journalist attempted to interview an ordinary man on the street about the incident. The man said that he knew nothing about it, and was "just out getting some soy sauce." After that, this became a very popular Internet meme, used to indicate that some people do not care about what goes on in society, or that bigger issues do not concern them because they are powerless to affect the outcome anyway.
"Make 100 million first" – during a 2016 interview, talk show host Chen Luyu asked Wanda Group chairman and Asia's richest man Wang Jianlin what his advice was for young people whose goal was to "become the richest person," Wang responded, "first, set a small goal. For instance, let's make one hundred million first." That Wang referred to an astronomical sum of money as a "small goal" was derided on social media, with many spoofs appearing parodying the phrase.
Sister Feng — gained significant attention in late 2009, after passing out flyers in Shanghai seeking a marriageable boyfriend with extreme demands.
"My dad is Li Gang!" – a popular Internet catchphrase in 2010, following the Li Gang incident.
Q-version – cartoonification or infantilization in the artistic renderings of real life characters or objects, often associated with the chibi style.
Very erotic very violent – a common Internet catchphrase, after a report by Xinwen Lianbo, the most viewed of China's state-sponsored news programs, where a young girl was reported to have come across content on the Internet which was "Very erotic, very violent". This incident sparked wide forms of parody on the Internet, and also questioned the credibility of the state broadcaster's newscasts.
Very good very mighty – a common catchphrase found throughout Chinese forums, and has many different variants.
Black-person question-mark face – "Excuse me?", apparently derived from the Confused Nick Young meme.
Duang – a sound used by Jackie Chan to express astonishment/surprise in a notorious Bawang Shampoo commercial. This sound was parodied by Bilibili user "绯色toy" then quickly went viral and became a meme among Chinese netizens.
"Prehistoric powers" – during an interview after her 100 m backstroke semi-final at the 2016 Summer Olympics, Chinese swimmer Fu Yuanhui expressed her surprise after being told she had just recorded a personal best and set a national record, responding to the news by saying that she must have used her "prehistoric powers". Her series of facial expressions spread widely on the Internet and this phrase quickly became a popular catchphrase.
"Smells good" – from the reality show X-Change Season 8, Episode 3 by Hunan Television, an extremely spoiled teenager called Wang Jingze was forced to live in rural area for a period of time. He threw a fit and attempted to escape because he could not stand the "bad quality" food and water in the countryside. He protested that he would rather die from starving or commit suicide than eat anything from there. However, he finally eat the fried rice cooked by his companion and praised "smells good". Eventually, the netizens used that word to tease the infirmity or change of attitude of somebody.
"No zuo no die" – a Chinese Internet meme. The original wording of the Chinese phrase, meaning "one would not be in trouble had one not asked for it", was half-translated to Chinglish where it retained one of its Chinese characters in pinyin.
"Liuxue" – a meme that went viral since 2017, widely used by netizens to mock the Chinese artist Liu Xiao Ling Tong.
“Jie ge bu yao" A Taiwan sex ed that was funny and became a meme in 2017.

Politically motivated memes
Baidu 10 Mythical Creatures – a popular meme regarding a series of mythical creatures, with names which referred to various Chinese profanities. It is seen by some observers as a form of protest against increased Internet censorship in China introduced in early 2009.
Green Dam Girl – Chinese netizens' reaction to the release and distribution of Green Dam Youth Escort, a form of content control software. The Green Dam Girl is a manga-style moe anthropomorphism representation of the software, where common themes involve censorship, satire and sexuality.
"Too simple, sometimes naive" – an English-language phrase used by then Chinese Communist Party general secretary Jiang Zemin in October 2000 during a question-and-answer period with reporters while meeting then Hong Kong chief executive Tung Chee-hwa. Widely regarded to be in poor taste, Jiang was using the phrase to scold reporters who was asking whether or not Jiang had given an "imperial order" to appoint Tung to another term as chief executive.
Vacation-style treatment – a euphemism used by the authorities in 2012 to explain the disappearance of Chongqing vice-mayor Wang Lijun who was likely forced from office and disappeared from public view due to a dispute with then party secretary Bo Xilai. Became a meme after Internet users began parodying and ridiculing the phrase, comparing it with a similar euphemism "maintenance-oriented demolition"; a sample post from Sina Weibo read: "Maintenance-oriented demolition, vacation-style treatment. Why don't we continue: consoling-style rape, harmony-oriented looting, environmentally-friendly-style killing, research-oriented theft."

Memes originating outside China
Elisa Lam elevator video – in February 2013 the Los Angeles Police Department released a video taken by a surveillance camera in an elevator at the city's Cecil Hotel, showing 21-year-old Chinese Canadian tourist Elisa Lam, a Hong Kong native, acting strangely while the elevator remained stopped with its door open. At the time she was missing; two weeks later her drowned body was found in one of the hotel's rooftop water tanks. Lam's actions in the video, which drew 3 million views on Youku, have been the subject of much speculation relating to unresolved questions around her death. 
Fist of the North Star – a Japanese manga commonly subject to parody in mainland China and Taiwan.
Hong Kong 97 – a video game made in Japan and set around the handover of Hong Kong in 1997, which features poor quality graphics, difficult gameplay, and character control, and a bizarre storyline. The game has gained a cult following for its notoriously poor quality—it has been ranked as a kusogē (Japanese for "shitty game"), a game so bad that it is good.

See also
List of Internet phenomena
Chinese Internet slang
Internet censorship in China

References